Lam-e Darish (also Romanized as Lam-e Darīsh; also known as Lam-e Darvīsh) is a village in Keshvar Rural District, Papi District, Khorramabad County, Lorestan Province, Iran. At the 2006 census, its population was 22, in 5 families.

References 

Towns and villages in Khorramabad County